Thomas Libiih (born 17 November 1967) is a Cameroonian former footballer. He played for various clubs, including Tonnerre Yaoundé and Ohud Medina. He also participated in the 1990 FIFA World Cup and 1994 FIFA World Cup.

Libiih had a brief spell with LDU Portoviejo in Ecuador.

He works as a coach at FC Lotus-Terek Yaoundé, a Cameroonian farm team of Russian FC Terek Grozny, created by Guy Stephane Essame.

References

1967 births
Living people
Footballers from Douala
Cameroonian footballers
Cameroonian expatriate footballers
Cameroon international footballers
Tonnerre Yaoundé players
Ohod Club players
Saudi Professional League players
L.D.U. Portoviejo footballers
1990 FIFA World Cup players
1994 FIFA World Cup players
1990 African Cup of Nations players
Cameroonian expatriate sportspeople in Saudi Arabia
Cameroonian expatriate sportspeople in Ecuador
Expatriate footballers in Saudi Arabia
Expatriate footballers in Ecuador
Association football midfielders